Mohammadabad-e Seyyed Jalal (also Romanized as Moḩammadābād-e Seyyed Jalāl) is a village in Bahreman Rural District, Nuq District, Rafsanjan County, Kerman Province, Iran. At the 2006 census, its population was 32, in 8 families.

References 

Populated places in Rafsanjan County